Antipodochlora is a genus of dragonfly in the family Corduliidae. It contains the following species:
 Antipodochlora braueri – Dusk dragonfly

References

Corduliidae
Taxonomy articles created by Polbot